Ri Myong-Sam (born 6 May 1974) is a North Korean football player.

Ri appeared for the Korea DPR national football team in ten 2006 FIFA World Cup qualifying matches.

References

External links

1974 births
Living people
North Korea international footballers
North Korean footballers
April 25 Sports Club players
Association football defenders